The Judo Competition at the 2009 Mediterranean Games were held in Pescara, Italy from 2 to 5 July 2009.

Medal overview

Men

Women

Medal table

References
Results of the 2009 Mediterranean Games (JudoInside.com)

M
Judo
2009
Judo competitions in Italy